Hello & Goodbye is the seventh and final studio album by the Christian pop group Jump5. The album includes a cover of the Beatles' song "Hello, Goodbye" which former Jump5 member Libby Hodges performs guest vocals on, a cover of the Christian hymn "I Surrender All", a re-recorded version of "Throw Your Hands Up", and a recording of the U.S. national anthem.

Track listing

References

2007 albums
Jump5 albums